In evolutionary biology, mimicry is an evolved resemblance between an organism and another object, often an organism of another species. Mimicry may evolve between different species, or between individuals of the same species. Often, mimicry functions to protect a species from predators, making it an anti-predator adaptation. Mimicry evolves if a receiver (such as a predator) perceives the similarity between a mimic (the organism that has a resemblance) and a model (the organism it resembles) and as a result changes its behaviour in a way that provides a selective advantage to the mimic. The resemblances that evolve in mimicry can be visual, acoustic, chemical, tactile, or electric, or combinations of these sensory modalities. Mimicry may be to the advantage of both organisms that share a resemblance, in which case it is a form of mutualism; or mimicry can be to the detriment of one, making it parasitic or competitive. The evolutionary convergence between groups is driven by the selective action of a signal-receiver or dupe. Birds, for example, use sight to identify palatable insects and butterflies, whilst avoiding the noxious ones. Over time, palatable insects may evolve to resemble noxious ones, making them mimics and the noxious ones models. In the case of mutualism, sometimes both groups are referred to as "co-mimics". It is often thought that models must be more abundant than mimics, but this is not so. Mimicry may involve numerous species; many harmless species such as hoverflies are Batesian mimics of strongly defended species such as wasps, while many such well-defended species form Müllerian mimicry rings, all resembling each other. Mimicry between prey species and their predators often involves three or more species.

In its broadest definition, mimicry can include non-living models. The specific terms masquerade and mimesis are sometimes used when the models are inanimate. For example, animals such as flower mantises, planthoppers, comma and geometer moth caterpillars resemble twigs, bark, leaves, bird droppings or flowers. Many animals bear eyespots, which are hypothesized to resemble the eyes of larger animals. They may not resemble any specific organism's eyes, and whether or not animals respond to them as eyes is also unclear. Nonetheless, eyespots are the subject of a rich contemporary literature. The model is usually another species, except in automimicry, where members of the species mimic other members, or other parts of their own bodies, and in inter-sexual mimicry, where members of one sex mimic members of the other.

Mimicry can result in an evolutionary arms race if mimicry negatively affects the model, and the model can evolve a different appearance from the mimic.p161 Mimicry should not be confused with other forms of convergent evolution that occurs when species come to resemble each other by adapting to similar lifestyles that have nothing to do with a common signal receiver. Mimics may have different models for different life cycle stages, or they may be polymorphic, with different individuals imitating different models, such as in Heliconius butterflies. Models themselves may have more than one mimic, though frequency dependent selection favours mimicry where models outnumber mimics. Models tend to be relatively closely related organisms, but mimicry of vastly different species is also known. Most known mimics are insects, though many other examples including vertebrates are also known. Plants and fungi may also be mimics, though less research has been carried out in this area.

Etymology
Use of the word mimicry dates to 1637. It derives from the Greek term mimetikos, "imitative", in turn from mimetos, the verbal adjective of mimeisthai, "to imitate". Originally used to describe people, "mimetic" was used in zoology from 1851, "mimicry" from 1861.

Classification

Many types of mimicry have been described. An overview of each follows, highlighting the similarities and differences between the various forms. Classification is often based on function with respect to the mimic (e.g., avoiding harm). Some cases may belong to more than one class, e.g., automimicry and aggressive mimicry are not mutually exclusive, as one describes the species relationship between model and mimic, while the other describes the function for the mimic (obtaining food). The terminology used is not without debate and attempts to clarify have led to new terms being included. The term "masquerade" is sometimes used when the model is inanimate but it is differentiated from "crypsis" in its strict sense by the potential response of the signal receiver. In crypsis the receiver is assumed to not respond while a masquerader confuses the recognition system of the receiver that would otherwise seek the signaller. In the other forms of mimicry, the signal is not filtered out by the sensory system of the receiver. These are not mutually exclusive and in the evolution of wasp-like appearance, it has been argued that insects evolve to masquerade wasps since predatory wasps do not attack each other but this mimetic resemblance also deters vertebrate predators.

Defensive
Defensive or protective mimicry takes place when organisms are able to avoid harmful encounters by deceiving enemies into treating them as something else.

The first three such cases discussed here entail mimicry of animals protected by warning coloration:
 Batesian mimicry, where a harmless mimic poses as harmful.
 Müllerian mimicry, where two or more harmful species mutually advertise themselves as harmful.
 Mertensian mimicry, where a deadly mimic resembles a less harmful but lesson-teaching model.

The fourth case, Vavilovian mimicry, where weeds resemble crops, involves humans as the agent of selection.

Batesian

In Batesian mimicry the mimic shares signals similar to the model, but does not have the attribute that makes it unprofitable to predators (e.g., unpalatability). In other words, a Batesian mimic is a sheep in wolf's clothing. It is named after Henry Walter Bates, an English naturalist whose work on butterflies in the Amazon rainforest (described in The Naturalist on the River Amazons) was pioneering in this field of study. Mimics are less likely to be found out (for example by predators) when in low proportion to their model. This phenomenon is called negative frequency dependent selection, and it applies in most forms of mimicry. Batesian mimicry can only be maintained if the harm caused to the predator by eating a model outweighs the benefit of eating a mimic. The nature of learning is weighted in favor of the mimics, for a predator that has a bad first experience with a model tends to avoid anything that looks like it for a long time, and does not re-sample soon to see whether the initial experience was a false negative. However, if mimics become more abundant than models, then the probability of a young predator having a first experience with a mimic increases. Such systems are therefore most likely to be stable where both the model and the mimic occur, and where the model is more abundant than the mimic. This is not the case in Müllerian mimicry, which is described next.

There are many Batesian mimics in the order Lepidoptera. Consul fabius and Eresia eunice imitate unpalatable Heliconius butterflies such as H. ismenius. Limenitis arthemis imitate the poisonous pipevine swallowtail (Battus philenor). Several palatable moths produce ultrasonic click calls to mimic unpalatable tiger moths. Octopuses of the genus Thaumoctopus (the mimic octopus) are able to intentionally alter their body shape and coloration to resemble dangerous sea snakes or lionfish. In the Amazon, the helmeted woodpecker (Dryocopus galeatus), a rare species which lives in the Atlantic Forest of Brazil, Paraguay, and Argentina, has a similar red crest, black back, and barred underside to two larger woodpeckers: Dryocopus lineatus and Campephilus robustus. This mimicry reduces attacks on Dryocopus galeatus from other animals. Scientists had falsely believed that D. galeatus was a close cousin of the other two species, because of the visual similarity, and because the three species live in the same habitat and eat similar food. Batesian mimicry also occurs in the plant kingdom, such as the chameleon vine, which adapts its leaf shape and colour to match that of the plant it is climbing, such that its edible leaves appear to be the less desirable leaves of its host.

Müllerian

Müllerian mimicry, named for the German naturalist Fritz Müller, describes a situation where two or more species have similar warning or aposematic signals and both share genuine anti-predation attributes (e.g. being unpalatable). At first, Bates could not explain why this should be so—if both were harmful why did one need to mimic another? Müller put forward the first explanation and mathematical model for this phenomenon: if a common predator confuses two species, individuals in both those species are more likely to survive. This type of mimicry is unique in several respects. Firstly, both the mimic and the model benefit from the interaction, which could thus be classified as mutualism. The signal receiver also benefits by this system, despite being deceived about species identity, as it is able to generalize the pattern to potentially harmful encounters. The distinction between mimic and model that is clear in Batesian mimicry is also blurred. Where one species is scarce and another abundant, the rare species can be said to be the mimic. When both are present in similar numbers, however, it makes more sense to speak of each as a co-mimic than of distinct 'mimic' and 'model' species, as their warning signals tend to converge. Also, the mimetic species may exist on a continuum from harmless to highly noxious, so Batesian mimicry grades smoothly into Müllerian convergence.

The monarch butterfly (Danaus plexippus) is a member of a Müllerian complex with the viceroy butterfly (Limenitis archippus), sharing coloration patterns and display behaviour. The viceroy has subspecies with somewhat different coloration, each closely matching the local Danaus species. For example, in Florida, the pairing is of the viceroy and the queen butterfly, whereas in Mexico the viceroy resembles the soldier butterfly. The viceroy is thus involved in three different Müllerian pairs. This example was long believed to be Batesian, with the viceroy mimicking the monarch, but the viceroy is actually more unpalatable than the Queen. The genus Morpho is palatable, but some species (such as M. amathonte) are strong fliers; birds – even species that specialize in catching butterflies on the wing – find it hard to catch them. The conspicuous blue coloration shared by most Morpho species may be Müllerian, or may be "pursuit aposematism". Since Morpho butterflies are sexually dimorphic, the males' iridescent coloration may also relate to sexual selection. The "orange complex" of distasteful butterfly species includes the heliconiines Agraulis vanillae, Dryadula phaetusa, and Dryas iulia. At least seven species of millipedes in the genera Apheloria and Brachoria (Xystodesmidae) form a Müllerian mimicry ring in the eastern United States, in which unrelated polymorphic species converge on similar colour patterns where their range overlaps.

Emsleyan/Mertensian

Emsleyan or Mertensian mimicry describes the unusual case where a deadly prey mimics a less dangerous species. It was first proposed by M. G. Emsley as a possible explanation for how a predator can learn to avoid a very dangerous aposematic animal, such as a coral snake, when the predator is very likely to die, making learning unlikely. The theory was developed by the German biologist Wolfgang Wickler who named it after the German herpetologist Robert Mertens.

The scenario is unusual, as it is usually the most harmful species that is the model. But if a predator dies on its first encounter with a deadly snake, it has no occasion to learn to recognize the snake's warning signals. There would then be no advantage for an extremely deadly snake in being aposematic: any predator that attacked it would be killed before it could learn to avoid the deadly prey, so the snake would be better off being camouflaged, to avoid attacks altogether. But if the predator first learnt to avoid a less deadly snake that had warning colours, the deadly species could then profit (be attacked less often) by mimicking the less dangerous snake.

Some harmless milk snake (Lampropeltis triangulum) subspecies, the moderately toxic false coral snakes (genus Erythrolamprus), and the deadly coral snakes (genus Micrurus) all have a red background color with black and white / yellow rings. In this system, both the milk snakes and the deadly coral snakes are mimics, whereas the false coral snakes are the model.

Wasmannian

In Wasmannian mimicry, the mimic resembles a model that it lives along with in a nest or colony. Most of the models here are social insects such as ants, termites, bees and wasps.

Vavilovian

Vavilovian mimicry is found in weeds that come to share characteristics with a domesticated plant through artificial selection. It is named after Russian botanist and geneticist Nikolai Vavilov. Selection against the weed may occur either by manually killing the weed, or by separating its seeds from those of the crop by winnowing.

Vavilovian mimicry presents an illustration of unintentional (or rather 'anti-intentional') selection by man. Weeders do not want to select weeds and their seeds that look increasingly like cultivated plants, yet there is no other option. For example, early barnyard grass, Echinochloa oryzoides, is a weed in rice fields and looks similar to rice; its seeds are often mixed in rice and have become difficult to separate through Vavilovian mimicry. Vavilovian mimics may eventually be domesticated themselves, as in the case of rye in wheat; Vavilov called these weed-crops secondary crops.

Vavilovian mimicry can be classified as defensive mimicry, in that the weed mimics a protected species. This bears strong similarity to Batesian mimicry in that the weed does not share the properties that give the model its protection, and both the model and the dupe (in this case people) are harmed by its presence. There are some key differences, though; in Batesian mimicry, the model and signal receiver are enemies (the predator would eat the protected species if it could), whereas here the crop and its human growers are in a mutualistic relationship: the crop benefits from being dispersed and protected by people, despite being eaten by them. In fact, the crop's only "protection" relevant here is its usefulness to humans. Secondly, the weed is not eaten, but simply destroyed. The only motivation for killing the weed is its effect on crop yields. Finally, this type of mimicry does not occur in ecosystems unaltered by humans.

Gilbertian

Gilbertian mimicry involves only two species. The potential host (or prey) drives away its parasite (or predator) by mimicking it, the reverse of host-parasite aggressive mimicry. It was coined by Pasteur as a phrase for such rare mimicry systems, and is named after the American ecologist .

Gilbertian mimicry occurs in the genus Passiflora. The leaves of this plant contain toxins that deter herbivorous animals. However, some Heliconius butterfly larvae have evolved enzymes that break down these toxins, allowing them to specialize on this genus. This has created further selection pressure on the host plants, which have evolved stipules that mimic mature Heliconius eggs near the point of hatching. These butterflies tend to avoid laying eggs near existing ones, which helps avoid exploitative intraspecific competition between caterpillars — those that lay on vacant leaves provide their offspring with a greater chance of survival. Most Heliconius larvae are cannibalistic, meaning that on leaves older eggs hatch first and eat the new arrivals. Thus, it seems that such plants have evolved egg dummies under selection pressure from these grazing herbivore enemies. In addition, the decoy eggs are also nectaries, attracting predators of the caterpillars such as ants and wasps as a further defence.

Browerian

Browerian mimicry, named after Lincoln P. Brower and Jane Van Zandt Brower, is a postulated form of automimicry; where the model belongs to the same species as the mimic. This is the analogue of Batesian mimicry within a single species, and occurs when there is a palatability spectrum within a population. Examples include the monarch and the queen from the subfamily Danainae, which feed on milkweed species of varying toxicity. These species store toxins from its host plant, which are maintained even in the adult (imago) form. As levels of toxin vary depending on diet during the larval stage, some individuals are more toxic than others. Less palatable organisms, therefore, mimic more dangerous individuals, with their likeness already perfected.

This is not always the case, however. In sexually dimorphic species, one sex may be more of a threat than the other, which could mimic the protected sex. Evidence for this possibility is provided by the behaviour of a monkey from Gabon, which regularly ate male moths of the genus Anaphe, but promptly stopped after it tasted a noxious female.

Aggressive

Predators

Aggressive mimicry is found in predators or parasites that share some of the characteristics of a harmless species, allowing them to avoid detection by their prey or host; this can be compared with the story of the wolf in sheep's clothing as long as it is understood that no conscious deceptive intent is involved. The mimic may resemble the prey or host itself, or another organism that is either neutral or beneficial to the signal receiver. In this class of mimicry, the model may be affected negatively, positively or not at all. Just as parasites can be treated as a form of predator, host-parasite mimicry is treated here as a subclass of aggressive mimicry.

The mimic may have a particular significance for duped prey. One such case is spiders, amongst which aggressive mimicry is quite common both in luring prey and disguising stealthily approaching predators. One case is the golden orb weaver (Nephila clavipes), which spins a conspicuous golden colored web in well-lit areas. Experiments show that bees are able to associate the webs with danger when the yellow pigment is not present, as occurs in less well-lit areas where the web is much harder to see. Other colours were also learned and avoided, but bees seemed least able to effectively associate yellow-pigmented webs with danger. Yellow is the colour of many nectar-bearing flowers, however, so perhaps avoiding yellow is not worthwhile. Another form of mimicry is based not on colour but pattern. Species such as the silver argiope (Argiope argentata) employ prominent patterns in the middle of their webs, such as zigzags. These may reflect ultraviolet light, and mimic the pattern seen in many flowers known as nectar guides. Spiders change their web day to day, which can be explained by the ability of bees to remember web patterns. Bees are able to associate a certain pattern with a spatial location, meaning the spider must spin a new pattern regularly or suffer diminishing prey capture.

Another case is where males are lured towards what seems to be a sexually receptive female. The model in this situation is the same species as the dupe. Beginning in the 1960s, James E. Lloyd's investigation of female fireflies of the genus Photuris revealed they emit the same light signals that females of the genus Photinus use as a mating signal. Further research showed male fireflies from several different genera are attracted to these "femmes fatales", and are subsequently captured and eaten. Female signals are based on that received from the male, each female having a repertoire of signals matching the delay and duration of the female of the corresponding species. This mimicry may have evolved from non-mating signals that have become modified for predation.

The listrosceline katydid Chlorobalius leucoviridis of inland Australia is capable of attracting male cicadas of the tribe Cicadettini by imitating the species-specific reply clicks of sexually receptive female cicadas. This example of acoustic aggressive mimicry is similar to the Photuris firefly case in that the predator's mimicry is remarkably versatile – playback experiments show that C. leucoviridis is able to attract males of many cicada species, including cicadettine cicadas from other continents, even though cicada mating signals are species-specific.

Some carnivorous plants may also be able to increase their rate of capture through mimicry.

Luring is not a necessary condition however, as the predator still has a significant advantage simply by not being identified as such. They may resemble a mutualistic symbiont or a species of little relevance to the prey.

A case of the latter situation is a species of cleaner fish and its mimic, though in this example the model is greatly disadvantaged by the presence of the mimic. Cleaner fish are the allies of many other species, which allow them to eat their parasites and dead skin. Some allow the cleaner to venture inside their body to hunt these parasites. However, one species of cleaner, the bluestreak cleaner wrasse (Labroides dimidiatus), is the unknowing model of a mimetic species, the sabre-toothed blenny (Aspidontus taeniatus). This wrasse resides in coral reefs in the Indian and the Pacific Oceans, and is recognized by other fishes that then let it clean them. Its imposter, a species of blenny, lives in the Indian Ocean—and not only looks like it in terms of size and coloration, but even mimics the cleaner's "dance". Having fooled its prey into letting its guard down, it then bites it, tearing off a piece of its fin before fleeing. Fish grazed on in this fashion soon learn to distinguish mimic from model, but because the similarity is close between the two they become much more cautious of the model as well, so both are affected. Due to victims' ability to discriminate between foe and helper, the blennies have evolved close similarity, right down to the regional level.

Another interesting example that does not involve any luring is the zone-tailed hawk, which resembles the turkey vulture. It flies amongst the vultures, suddenly breaking from the formation and ambushing its prey. Here the hawk's presence is of no evident significance to the vultures, affecting them neither negatively or positively.

Parasites

Parasites can also be aggressive mimics, though the situation is somewhat different from those outlined previously. Some predators have a feature that draws prey; parasites can also mimic their hosts' natural prey, but are eaten themselves, a pathway into their host. Leucochloridium, a genus of flatworm, matures in the digestive system of songbirds, their eggs then passing out of the bird in the faeces. They are then taken up by Succinea, a terrestrial snail. The eggs develop in this intermediate host, and must then find a suitable bird to mature in. Since the host birds do not eat snails, the sporocyst has another strategy to reach its host's intestine. They are brightly coloured and move in a pulsating fashion. A sporocyst-sac pulsates in the snail's eye stalks, coming to resemble an irresistible meal for a songbird. In this way, it can bridge the gap between hosts, allowing it to complete its life cycle. A nematode (Myrmeconema neotropicum) changes the colour of the abdomen of workers of the canopy ant Cephalotes atratus to make it appear like the ripe fruits of Hyeronima alchorneoides. It also changes the behaviour of the ant so that the gaster (rear part) is held raised. This presumably increases the chances of the ant being eaten by birds. The droppings of birds are collected by other ants and fed to their brood, thereby helping to spread the nematode.

In an unusual case, planidium larvae of some beetles of the genus Meloe form a group and produce a pheromone that mimics the sex attractant of its host bee species. When a male bee arrives and attempts to mate with the mass of larvae, they climb onto his abdomen. From there, they transfer to a female bee, and from there to the bee nest to parasitize the bee larvae.

Host-parasite mimicry is a two species system where a parasite mimics its own host. Cuckoos are a canonical example of brood parasitism, a form of parasitism where the mother has its offspring raised by another unwitting individual, often from a different species, cutting down the biological mother's parental investment in the process. The ability to lay eggs that mimic the host eggs is the key adaptation. The adaptation to different hosts is inherited through the female line in so-called gentes (gens, singular). Cases of intraspecific brood parasitism, where a female lays in a conspecific's nest, as illustrated by the goldeneye duck (Bucephala clangula), do not represent a case of mimicry. A different mechanism is chemical mimicry, as seen in the parasitic butterfly Phengaris rebeli, which parasitizes the ant species Myrmica schencki by releasing chemicals that fool the worker ants to believe that the caterpillar larvae are ant larvae, and enable the P. rebeli larvae to be brought directly into the M. schencki nest. Parasitic (cuckoo) bumblebees (formerly Psithyrus, now included in Bombus) resemble their hosts more closely than would be expected by chance, at least in areas like Europe where parasite-host co-speciation is common. However, this is explainable as Müllerian mimicry, rather than requiring the parasite's coloration to deceive the host and thus constitute aggressive mimicry.

Reproductive

Reproductive mimicry occurs when the actions of the dupe directly aid in the mimic's reproduction. This is common in plants with deceptive flowers that do not provide the reward they seem to offer and it may occur in Papua New Guinea fireflies, in which the signal of Pteroptyx effulgens is used by P. tarsalis to form aggregations to attract females. Other forms of mimicry have a reproductive component, such as Vavilovian mimicry involving seeds, vocal mimicry in birds, and aggressive and Batesian mimicry in brood parasite-host systems.

Bakerian and Dodsonian 

Bakerian mimicry, named after Herbert G. Baker, is a form of automimicry where female flowers mimic male flowers of their own species, cheating pollinators out of a reward. This reproductive mimicry may not be readily apparent as members of the same species may still exhibit some degree of sexual dimorphism. It is common in many species of Caricaceae.

Dodsonian mimicry, named after Calaway H. Dodson, is a form of reproductive floral mimicry where the model belongs to a different species than the mimic. By providing similar sensory signals as the model flower, it can lure its pollinators. Like Bakerian mimics, no nectar is provided. Epidendrum ibaguense (Orchidaceae) resembles flowers of Lantana camara and Asclepias curassavica, and is pollinated by monarch butterflies and perhaps hummingbirds. Similar cases are seen in some other species of the same family. The mimetic species may still have pollinators of its own though. For example, a lamellicorn beetle, which usually pollinates correspondingly colored Cistus flowers, is also known to aid in pollination of Ophrys species that are normally pollinated by bees.

Pseudocopulation

Pseudocopulation occurs when a flower mimics a female of a certain insect species, inducing the males to try to copulate with the flower. This is much like the aggressive mimicry in fireflies described previously, but with a more benign outcome for the pollinator. This form of mimicry has been called Pouyannian mimicry, after Maurice-Alexandre Pouyanne, who first described the phenomenon. It is most common in orchids, which mimic females of the order Hymenoptera (generally bees and wasps), and may account for around 60% of pollinations. Depending on the morphology of the flower, a pollen sac called a pollinia is attached to the head or abdomen of the male. This is then transferred to the stigma of the next flower the male tries to inseminate, resulting in pollination. Visual mimicry is the most obvious sign of this deception for humans, but the visual aspect may be minor or non-existent. It is the senses of touch and olfaction that are most important.

Inter-sexual mimicry

Inter-sexual mimicry occurs when individuals of one sex in a species mimic members of the opposite sex to facilitate sneak mating. An example is the three male forms of the marine isopod Paracerceis sculpta. Alpha males are the largest and guard a harem of females. Beta males mimic females and manage to enter the harem of females without being detected by the alpha males allowing them to mate. Gamma males are the smallest males and mimic juveniles. This also allows them to mate with the females without the alpha males detecting them. Similarly, among common side-blotched lizards, some males mimic the yellow throat coloration and even mating rejection behaviour of the other sex to sneak matings with guarded females. These males look and behave like unreceptive females. This strategy is effective against "usurper" males with orange throats, but ineffective against blue throated "guarder" males, which chase them away. Female spotted hyenas have pseudo-penises that make them look like males.

Automimicry

Automimicry or intraspecific mimicry occurs within a single species. One form of such mimicry is where one part of an organism's body resembles another part. For example, the tails of some snakes resemble their heads; they move backwards when threatened and present the predator with the tail, improving their chances of escape without fatal harm. Some fishes have eyespots near their tails, and when mildly alarmed swim slowly backwards, presenting the tail as a head. Some insects such as some lycaenid butterflies have tail patterns and appendages of various degrees of sophistication that promote attacks at the rear rather than at the head. Several species of pygmy owl bear "false eyes" on the back of the head, misleading predators into reacting as though they were the subject of an aggressive stare.

Some writers use the term "automimicry" when the mimic imitates other morphs within the same species. For example, in a species where males mimic females or vice versa, this may be an instance of sexual mimicry in evolutionary game theory. Examples are found in some species of birds, fishes, and lizards. Quite elaborate strategies along these lines are known, such as the well-known "scissors, paper, rock" mimicry in Uta stansburiana, but there are qualitatively different examples in many other species, such as some Platysaurus.

Many species of insects are toxic or distasteful when they have fed on certain plants that contain chemicals of particular classes, but not when they have fed on plants that lack those chemicals. For instance, some species of the subfamily Danainae feed on various species of the Asclepiadoideae in the family Apocynaceae, which render them poisonous and emetic to most predators. Such insects frequently are aposematically coloured and patterned. When feeding on innocuous plants however, they are harmless and nutritious, but a bird that once has sampled a toxic specimen is unlikely to eat harmless specimens that have the same aposematic coloration. When regarded as mimicry of toxic members of the same species, this too may be seen as automimicry.

Some species of caterpillar, such as many hawkmoths (Sphingidae), have eyespots on their anterior abdominal segments. When alarmed, they retract the head and the thoracic segments into the body, leaving the apparently threatening large eyes at the front of the visible part of the body.

Many insects have filamentous "tails" at the ends of their wings and patterns of markings on the wings themselves. These combine to create a "false head". This misdirects predators such as birds and jumping spiders (Salticidae). Spectacular examples occur in the hairstreak butterflies; when perching on a twig or flower, they commonly do so upside down and shift their rear wings repeatedly, causing antenna-like movements of the "tails" on their wings. Studies of rear-wing damage support the hypothesis that this strategy is effective in deflecting attacks from the insect's head.

Other forms

Some forms of mimicry do not fit easily within the classification given above. Floral mimicry is induced by the discomycete fungus Monilinia vaccinii-corymbosi. In this case, a fungal plant pathogen infects leaves of blueberries, causing them to secrete sugars, in effect mimicking the nectar of flowers. To the naked eye the leaves do not look like flowers, yet they still attract pollinating insects like bees using an ultraviolet signal. This case is unusual, in that the fungus benefits from the deception but it is the leaves that act as mimics, being harmed in the process. It is similar to host-parasite mimicry, but the host does not receive the signal. It has something in common with automimicry, but the plant does not benefit from the mimicry, and the action of the pathogen is required to produce it.

Evolution

It is widely accepted that mimicry evolves as a positive adaptation. The lepidopterist and novelist Vladimir Nabokov however argued that although natural selection might stabilize a "mimic" form, it would not be necessary to create it.

The most widely accepted model used to explain the evolution of mimicry in butterflies is the two-step hypothesis. The first step involves mutation in modifier genes that regulate a complex cluster of linked genes that cause large changes in morphology. The second step consists of selections on genes with smaller phenotypic effects, creating an increasingly close resemblance. This model is supported by empirical evidence that suggests that a few single point mutations cause large phenotypic effects, while numerous others produce smaller effects. Some regulatory elements collaborate to form a supergene for the development of butterfly color patterns. The model is supported by computational simulations of population genetics. The Batesian mimicry in Papilio polytes is controlled by the doublesex gene.

Some mimicry is imperfect. Natural selection drives mimicry only far enough to deceive predators. For example, when predators avoid a mimic that imperfectly resembles a coral snake, the mimic is sufficiently protected.

Convergent evolution is an alternative explanation for why organisms such as coral reef fish and benthic marine invertebrates such as sponges and nudibranchs have come to resemble each other.

See also

 Biomimicry
 Chemical mimicry
 Locomotor mimicry
 Molecular mimicry
 Preadaptation
 Semiotics
 Mimic octopus

Notes

References

Further reading

  (a supplement of volume 131 of the journal American Naturalist dedicated to E. B. Ford).
  
 Cott, H. B. (1940) Adaptive Coloration in Animals. Methuen and Co, London, 
 
 Edmunds, M. 1974. Defence in Animals: a survey of anti-predator defences. Harlow, Essex and New York, Longman. .
 
 Owen, D. (1980) Camouflage and Mimicry. Oxford University Press, .
 
 Stevens, M. (2016). Cheats and deceits: how animals and plants exploit and mislead. Oxford University Press, 
 
 
 Wickler, W. (1968) Mimicry in Plants and Animals (translated from the German), McGraw-Hill, New York. .

Children's

 Hoff, M. K. (2003) Mimicry and Camouflage. Creative Education. Mankato, Minnesota, USA, Great Britain. .

External links

 Warning colour and mimicry • Lecture outline from University College London
 Camouflage and Mimicry in Fossils

Mimicry
Polymorphism (biology)
Camouflage
Warning coloration